Pedro Ricardo Bandarra Lavoura (29 June 1974 – 13 August 2000) was a Venezuelan footballer who played as a midfielder. He was killed in a car accident in 2000 - his second accident in three years.

Career statistics

Club

Notes

References

1974 births
2000 deaths
Venezuelan footballers
Portuguese footballers
Association football midfielders
Anadia F.C. players
Associação Académica de Coimbra – O.A.F. players
S.C. Braga players
Segunda Divisão players
Liga Portugal 2 players
Primeira Liga players
Road incident deaths in Portugal
Footballers from Caracas